Dance or Die is the second studio album from the band Family Force 5. It was produced by Joe Baldridge (tobyMac) and lead vocalist Solomon "Soul Glow Activatur" Olds. The album was released on August 19, 2008 both in stores and via digital distribution. This is the band's second full-length album release. However, it is the band's first release on the Tooth & Nail Records label. The band was previously with Gotee Records. The record was leaked in its entirety on the internet on August 15, 2008. As of December 2009 the album has sold over 100,000 units. Dance or Die won Best Album at the 2008 Rock on Request Awards.

Genre
The album has been labeled as crunkcore, Christian rock, grunge, electronica, synthpop, dance-rock, R&B, urban and hip hop.

Track listing

Dance or Die pre-order package
Fans who pre-ordered the album online received the album, a limited edition T-shirt, and a Dance or Die sticker.

Dance or Die sold 17,000 copies in its first week and came in at 30 on the Billboard 200.

Music videos
A video for "Radiator" was released a month after the album. It features the band playing in a club style room with the Dance or Die logo behind them. A video for "Dance or Die" was released in August 2009.

Video games
The song "Radiator" was released as a downloadable track on the Rock Band Network.

Charts

References

Tooth & Nail Records albums
2008 albums